XIT may refer to:

XIT (band), a Native American rock group
 XIT, a name briefly used by the 1960s English pop group Consortium
XIT Ranch, a cattle ranch in Texas, United States

See also
Exit (disambiguation)